Rochelle Gilmore (born 14 December 1981) is an Australian former racing cyclist, owner and manager of the professional cycling team .

Career
Born in Sutherland, New South Wales, Gilmore competed in track cycling in her teens, before specialising in road racing for more than 10 years. In 2006, she won a stage at the Geelong Women's Tour, took second behind teammate Katherine Bates in the points race at the Commonwealth Games in 2002 and 2006, and earned top five finishes in a Giro d'Italia Femminile stage, the Geelong World Cup, and the Liberty Classic. Gilmore was often referred to in the media as the 'bridesmaid', as she constantly finished runner-up in many events. In the road race at the 2010 Commonwealth Games, she broke the jinx and won the gold medal in the  race. After her retirement she said she felt she achieved her maximum potential during her career through hard work and extensive preparation.

In addition to founding Wiggle-Honda, in January 2015 Gilmore announced the launch of the High5 Dream Team, an Australian women's team competing in Australia's National Road Series aiming to help riders progress to road racing in Europe and to fill a gap created by Cycling Australia suspending its women's development programme due to financial problems.

In a blogpost for cyclingnews.com in November 2015 Gilmore announced that she had retired from competition.

Major results

Track

1999
 National Junior Track Championships
1st  Scratch
1st  Points race
3rd Sprint
3rd 500m time trial
 2nd  Points race, UCI Junior Track Cycling World Championships
 3rd  Points race, Oceania Games
2000
 2nd  Points race, UCI Track Cycling World Cup Classics, Ipoh
2001
 2nd  Points race, UCI Track Cycling World Cup Classics, Pordenone
2002
 2nd  Scratch, UCI Track Cycling World Championships
 2nd  Points race, Commonwealth Games
 2nd  Scratch, UCI Track Cycling World Cup Classics, Moscow
2003
 UCI Track Cycling World Cup Classics
1st  Team sprint, Sydney
2nd  Scratch, Sydney
3rd  Team sprint, Cape Town
 2nd  Scratch, UCI Track Cycling World Championships
2004
 2nd  Scratch, UCI Track Cycling World Cup Classics, Manchester
2005
 1st  Points race, 2004–05 UCI Track Cycling World Cup Classics, Sydney
 Oceania Track Championships
1st  Points race
3rd  Scratch
2006
 2nd  Points race, Commonwealth Games

Road

1999
 3rd Time trial, National Junior Road Championships
2001
 1st GP Carnevale d'Europa
 1st Stage 2b Giro d'Italia Femminile
 3rd Canberra Women's Classic
 9th Rotterdam Tour
2002
 1st  Overall Bay Classic Series
1st Stages 2 & 4
 1st Stage 5 Tour de Snowy
 2nd Australia World Cup
 10th Rotterdam Tour
2003
 1st Stage 8 Giro d'Italia Femminile
 1st Stage 1 Geelong Tour
 3rd Primavera Rosa
 3rd Sparkassen Giro Bochum
 3rd Tjejtrampet
 6th Rotterdam Tour
 7th GP Liberazione
 7th Rund um die Nürnberger Altstadt
 8th Overall UCI Women's Road World Cup
 9th Australia World Cup
2004
 1st Stage 4 Bay Classic Series
 5th Australia World Cup
2005
 1st Geelong Women's World Cup
 2nd GP Liberazione
 2nd Rund um die Nürnberger Altstadt
 6th Road race, Oceania Road Cycling Championships
2006
 1st Stage 2 Geelong Tour
 5th Australia World Cup
 5th Liberty Classic
 8th GP Liberazione
 10th Road race, Commonwealth Games
2007
 1st  Road race, Oceania Road Cycling Championships
 1st Stage 1 La Route de France
 2nd Grand Prix de Dottignies
 2nd Drentse 8 van Dwingeloo
 4th Novilon Internationale Damesronde van Drenthe
 4th Rund um die Nürnberger Altstadt
 5th GP Liberazione
 5th Sparkassen Giro
 6th Ronde van Drenthe World Cup
 10th Tour de Berne
2008
 Tour de Prince Edward Island
1st Stages 1, 3 & 5
 1st Maastricht Omnium
 2nd GP Liberazione
 2nd Gran Premio Comune di Fabricco
 2nd Sparkassen Giro Bochum
 3rd Drentse 8 van Dwingeloo
 4th Australia World Cup
 5th Ronde van Drenthe
2009
 1st Sparkassen Giro Bochum
 Women's Tour of New Zealand
1st Stages 1 & 2
 2nd Ronde van Gelderland
 2nd GP Stad Roeselare
 2nd Rund um die Nürnberger Altstadt
 3rd  Road race, Oceania Road Cycling Championships (February)
 3rd  Road race, Oceania Road Cycling Championships (November)
 4th Drentse 8 van Dwingeloo
 5th Grand Prix de Dottignies
2010
 1st  Road race, Commonwealth Games
 2nd Ronde van Gelderland
 2nd Omloop van Borsele
 Tour of Chongming Island
3rd Overall Stage race
3rd World Cup
 4th Overall Ladies Tour of Qatar
 7th Grand Prix de Dottignies
 10th Omloop Door Middag-Humsterland
2011
 1st  Overall Bay Classic Series
1st Stages 1 & 3
 3rd Ronde van Gelderland
 4th Road race, Oceania Road Cycling Championships
 4th Grand Prix de Dottignies
 4th GP Stad Roeselare
 5th Ronde van Drenthe
 8th Overall Ladies Tour of Qatar
1st Stage 1
 8th Tour of Chongming Island World Cup
 9th Drentse 8 van Dwingeloo
2012
 2nd Grand Prix Cycliste de Gatineau
 2nd Liberty Classic
 4th Overall Bay Classic Series
 Tour of Chongming Island
5th Overall Stage race
5th World Cup
 9th Erondegemse Pijl
2015
 5th London Nocturne

References

External links

NZCT Tour of New Zealand results and articles
Cyclingnews Article on Rochelle's recovery from horror crash injuries
2011 Rochelle Gilmore interview with Sophie Smith from SBS

1981 births
Living people
Australian female cyclists
Cyclists at the 2002 Commonwealth Games
Cyclists at the 2006 Commonwealth Games
Cyclists at the 2010 Commonwealth Games
Commonwealth Games silver medallists for Australia
People from the Sutherland Shire
Sportswomen from New South Wales
Commonwealth Games gold medallists for Australia
Cyclists from Sydney
Commonwealth Games medallists in cycling
Medallists at the 2002 Commonwealth Games
Medallists at the 2006 Commonwealth Games
Medallists at the 2010 Commonwealth Games